Robert Dreher is an American lightweight rower. He won a gold medal at the 1990 World Rowing Championships in Tasmania with the lightweight men's double scull.

References

Year of birth missing (living people)
Living people
American male rowers
World Rowing Championships medalists for the United States
Pan American Games medalists in rowing
Pan American Games bronze medalists for the United States
Rowers at the 1987 Pan American Games
Medalists at the 1987 Pan American Games